is a major railway station in Tokyo's Taitō ward. It is the station used to reach the Ueno district and Ueno Park—which contains Tokyo National Museum, The National Museum of Western Art, Ueno Zoo, Tokyo University of the Arts and other famous cultural facilities. A major commuter hub, it is also the traditional terminus for long-distance trains from northern Japan, although with the extension of the Shinkansen lines to Tokyo Station this role has diminished in recent years. A similar extension of conventional lines extended Takasaki Line, Utsunomiya Line and Jōban Line services to Tokyo Station via the Ueno-Tokyo Line in March 2015, using existing little-used tracks and a new viaduct; the Ueno-Tokyo Line connects these lines with the Tōkaidō Main Line, allowing through services to Shinagawa, Yokohama, Odawara and Atami stations.

Ueno Station is close to Keisei Ueno Station, the Tokyo terminus of the Keisei Main Line to Narita Airport Station.

Lines
This station is served by the following lines:
Tokyo Metro
 
 
East Japan Railway Company
Tōhoku Shinkansen
Yamagata Shinkansen
Akita Shinkansen
Jōetsu Shinkansen
Hokuriku Shinkansen
Hokkaido Shinkansen
 Utsunomiya Line (Tōhoku Main Line)
 Takasaki Line
 Keihin–Tōhoku Line
 Yamanote Line
 Jōban Line

As this station was the traditional point of arrival and departure for journeys to northern Japan, it became the inspiration for many poems and song lyrics, including a famous poem by Ishikawa Takuboku. There is a memorial plate about this poem in the station.

Station layout

Like most major stations in Japan, Ueno station contains and is surrounded by extensive shopping arcades. Ueno's includes a branch of the Hard Rock Cafe.

JR East platforms

This station has two main levels of tracks and a deep underground station for the Tōhoku Shinkansen tracks. Through tracks 1 to 4 on two island platforms on the main level are used by Yamanote Line and Keihin-Tohoku Line trains. Tracks 5 to 9 on two island platforms and one side of a terminal platform lead to the Ueno-Tokyo Line to Tokyo Station and beyond on the Tōkaidō Main Line. Tracks 10 to 12 terminate inside the building, and below these on a lower deck are further terminal tracks 13 to 17 (Track No.18 has been removed). Two subterranean island platforms serve Shinkansen tracks 19 to 22.

Chest-high platform edge doors were installed on the two Yamanote Line platforms (2 and 3) in November 2015, and brought into use from December.

Tokyo Metro platforms

Both the Ginza and Hibiya line station have two tracks; however, unlike in other Tokyo Metro stations, each line's tracks are counted separately.

History

This station opened on 28 July 1883. After the destruction of this first building in the fires caused by the 1923 Great Kantō earthquake, Japanese Government Railways constructed the current station buildings. In 1927, Tokyo Underground Railway (now Tokyo Metro) opened Japan's first subway line from here to Asakusa Station. Following World War II, the neighbourhood in front of Ueno Station was a major center of black market activity. Today, many people come to the area to visit Ameya-Yokochō.

The station facilities of the Ginza and Hibiya Lines were inherited by Tokyo Metro after the privatization of the Teito Rapid Transit Authority (TRTA) in 2004.

In March 2010, to promote the release of the Cho-Den-O Trilogy of the Kamen Rider movies, a special marking was used on the trains going to Nakano-fujimichō from Ueno, and Den-O'''s Rina Akiyama greeted 200 fans who rode on the first of those trains.

Station numbering was introduced to the non-Shinkansen JR East platforms in 2016 with Ueno being assigned station numbers JU02 for the Utsunomiya line, JJ01 for the Jōban Line rapid service, JK31 for the Keihin–Tōhoku Line, and JY05 for the Yamanote line. At the same time, JR East assigned the station a three-letter code to its major transfer stations; Ueno was assigned the code "UEN".

In March 2020, the Park Exit (Ueno Park Exit) was moved to the north and the roadway in front of it was changed to a dead end, allowing pedestrians to enter Ueno Park from the station without crossing the roadway.

Passenger statistics
In fiscal 2013, the JR East station was used by 181,880 passengers daily (boarding passengers only), making it the thirteenth-busiest station operated by JR East. In fiscal 2013, the Tokyo Metro station was used by an average of 211,539 passengers per day (exiting and entering passengers), making it the eighth-busiest station operated by Tokyo Metro.

The daily passenger figures for each operator in previous years are as shown below.

 Note that JR East figures are for boarding passengers only.

 Bus services 

 Highway buses 
 Sky / Panda; For Hirosaki, Aomori Station
 Yuhi; For Tsuruoka Station, Amarume Station, and Sakata Station
 Tono Kamaishi; For Shin-Hanamaki Station, Tōno Station, Kamaishi Station, and Yamada
 Tokyo Sunrise; For Yamagata Station, Sagae Station, Sakurambo-Higashine Station, and Shinjō Station
 Rainbow; Yonezawa Station, Kaminoyama-Onsen Station, and Yamagata Station
 For Chino, Matsumoto Bus Terminal, and Nagano Station
 Dream Kanazawa; For Toyama Station, Kanazawa Station, and Kanazawa Institute of Technology
 Kimasshi; For Kanazawa Station
 Yamato; For Tenri Station, Nara Station, Kintetsu-Kōriyama Station, Hōryū-ji, Ōji Station, and Goidō Station
 For Ōtsu Station, Yamashina Station, Sanjō Station, and Kyōto Station
 Flying Liner; For Kyōto Station, Ōsaka Station, Ōsaka Namba Station, Ōsaka Abenobashi Station, and Fujiidera Station
 Mamakari Liner; For  Okayama Station, Kurashiki Station

See also

 List of railway stations in Japan
 Transport in Greater Tokyo

In Literature
 Tokyo Ueno Station'', by Yu Miri, English tr. by Morgan Giles (Tilted Axis, 2019.  // Penguin Randomhouse, 2020. )

References

External links

Ueno Station (Tokyo Metro) 
Ueno Station (JR East) 
JR East Ueno Station map
Ueno Station Panorama

Yamanote Line
Keihin-Tōhoku Line
Tōhoku Main Line
Takasaki Line
Jōban Line
Tōhoku Shinkansen
Yamagata Shinkansen
Jōetsu Shinkansen
Tokyo Metro Ginza Line
Utsunomiya Line
Stations of East Japan Railway Company
Stations of Tokyo Metro
Railway stations in Tokyo
Railway stations in Japan opened in 1883
Ueno, Tokyo
Buildings and structures in Taitō